Patrick Roest (born 7 December 1995) is a Dutch professional long track speed skater who has won the World Allround Speed Skating Championships three times. He leads the adelskalender, an all-time ranking of skaters' personal bests. He is a member of the commercial team of Team Reggeborgh.

Career
In Bjugn, Norway, in 2014, Roest became World Junior Champion Allround, and he successfully defended his world title in 2015 in Warsaw, Poland.

On 12 November, he was part of the Dutch team that won the team pursuit event at the first World Cup of the 2016/17 season.

Roest was awarded the KNSB Cup for his 1500 m performance at the KNSB Cup in October 2016.

On 13 February 2018, Roest won a silver medal at the 2018 Winter Olympics for the Men's 1500 metres, behind compatriot Kjeld Nuis, with a time of 1:44.86. He also won an Olympic bronze medal in the team pursuit event.

Records

Personal records

Roest is the leader of the adelskalender, with 144.056 points.

As of 3 March 2019, Roest is the world record holder of the allround Big Combination classification, having amassed 145.561 points at the World Allround 2019 Championship in Calgary.

World records

Tournament overview

Source:

Note The event distances for the Allround classification are: 
 for the World Championship Junior 2014: 500, 3000, 1500 and 5000 meter
 for the World Championship Junior after 2014: 500, 1500, 1000 and 5000 meter
 for the World Championship Senior: 500, 5000, 1500 and 10000 meter

World Cup overview

 Source: 

– = Did not participate
(b) = Division B
 DQ = Disqualified
 GWC = Grand World Cup

Medals won

References

External links
 
 

1995 births
Living people
People from Steenwijkerland
Dutch male speed skaters
Speed skaters at the 2018 Winter Olympics
Speed skaters at the 2022 Winter Olympics
Olympic speed skaters of the Netherlands
Medalists at the 2018 Winter Olympics
Medalists at the 2022 Winter Olympics
Olympic medalists in speed skating
Olympic silver medalists for the Netherlands
Olympic bronze medalists for the Netherlands
World Allround Speed Skating Championships medalists
World Single Distances Speed Skating Championships medalists
Sportspeople from Overijssel
21st-century Dutch people